Reckoning is a 1981 live double album by the Grateful Dead. It is the band's sixth live album and seventeenth album overall. It consists of acoustic material recorded live in September and October 1980. Some of the tracks are shortened versions of the live performances.

The material recorded in 1980 was originally intended for release on one double LP set, but the format of the music subsequently steered the Grateful Dead towards the release of two double albums, Reckoning and Dead Set. Grateful Dead guitarist Jerry Garcia commented that the band "ended with so much good material that it was a struggle. The idea of just one acoustic and one electric record was sort of pathetic, since our electric tunes are seldom less than eight minutes long. And that meant our fat electric album would have two songs on a side. It was kind of silly."

Initial CD releases omitted one track, "Oh Babe, It Ain't No Lie", for space reasons.  One CD, tape, and LP release, by Pair/Arista Records in 1984, was given the title For the Faithful....  In 1988 the album was re-issued with the original title.

Track listing

Original release

2004 Rhino release bonus material, Disc two

Personnel
 Jerry Garcia – guitar, vocals
 Bob Weir – guitar, vocals
 Phil Lesh – bass guitar
 Brent Mydland – piano, harpsichord, vocals (except 1978 tracks)
 Bill Kreutzmann – drums
 Mickey Hart – drums

Production
 Produced by Dan Healy, Betty Cantor-Jackson, Jerry Garcia
 Mixing: Dan Healy
 Recording: Betty Cantor-Jackson
 Engineering: Don Pearson, John Cutler, Dennis Leonard
 Cover illustration: Rick Griffin
 Photography: John Werner

Charts
Album: Billboard

Singles: Billboard

References

1981 live albums
Albums produced by Dan Healy (soundman)
Albums produced by Jerry Garcia
Albums recorded at Radio City Music Hall
Albums with cover art by Rick Griffin
Arista Records live albums
Grateful Dead live albums
Rhino Records live albums